Geisha is a type of chocolate made by the Finnish company Fazer, available as a slab, a bar, or pralines. The chocolate includes Japonais hazelnut filling inside a shell of milk chocolate.

The Geisha chocolate was invented in 1962. Peter Fazer had grown to like the Japonica pastry made in the Karl Fazer Café on Kluuvikatu in Helsinki. He asked the product development department to try out this filling with milk chocolate.

The name "Geisha" and the pink colour were taken from a candy in the Fazerin Parhain ("Fazer's Best") candy bag, which was renamed Tokyo. Japan served as an inspiration to the product through the 1964 Summer Olympics in Tokyo, which Peter Fazer also competed in himself, in sailing.

In 2020 Fazer announced the company was considering the renaming the product.

References

External links
 Geisha review by the Oulu chocolate association
 Geisha at Fazer's official site

Fazer
Chocolate bars